White Lake is a hamlet (and census-designated place) in the town of Bethel, Sullivan County, New York, United States, on the southeastern shore of a lake of the same name. It was the closest community to the Woodstock Music Festival in 1969.

The community has a post office on New York Route 17B. Its ZIP Code is 12786. Its population in 2000 was reported at 665 and it is the largest community in the town of Bethel. The Bethel Town Hall is also located in the community.

The lake is reported to be the deepest lake in Sullivan County. Residents in the 19th century claimed that the biggest brook trout in the world (8 pounds, 14 ounces) was caught in the lake in 1843.

According to local lore, its Native American name was Kauneonga—meaning lake with two wings (the lake has a figure 8 layout resembling wings). The White Lake name is said to have come from the white sand beaches on its shores and white bottom. The northern portion of White Lake, formerly known as North White Lake, is now called Kauneonga Lake.

History
A saw mill and grist mill were established at the outlet of the lake circa 1804. In 1811, a hotel was established in the community, starting a long history of it becoming a resort.

The History of Sullivan County reports, "Physicians frequently send invalids to recover health from its life giving qualities. Instances of recovery almost incredible might be given: so that those who wish to combine rare scenery with healthiness of climate, a sojourn during the summer-months is desirable."

Writer Alfred B. Street extolled its virtues in his poem "White Lake", which includes these lines:

Hark! like an organ's tones, the woods
To the light wind murmurs wake;
The voice of the vast solitudes
Is speaking to the lake

The New York Times in 1903 wrote, "The railroad station for White Lake is either Liberty or Monticello. A picturesque drive over the Shawangunk Mountains brings one to this beautiful lake. The hotels which are on both sides are among the best in Sullivan County. At this place all aquatic sports may be indulged in."

In the late 19th century, large grand hotels, including the Mansion House, were built on the shores.  In the early 20th century, grand hotels gave way to bungalow style motels as it became a popular Borscht Belt destination, with more than 24 hotels and camps catering to Jews. Among these hotels was the Fur Workers' Resort (later White Lake Lodge, then Camp Hi-Li) which was initially aimed at furriers. The furriers gave it up after discovering that summer was the busiest season for them.

In the 1960s with the Borscht Belt declining various people made attempts to revitalize the area including an attempt by the Monticello Raceway to have harness racing on the frozen lake in the winter.

The community is home to one year-round synagogue: Congregation Beth Sinai, led by Rabbi Samuel J. Fishbain.  There is also a small egalitarian congregation Temple Beth-El, open from July to the High Holidays. It was also home to the Lapidus bungalow colony which closed in the 1970s and the property was sold to the religious Satmar community which boasts a new large synagogue and mikvah belonging to the Satmar Community of Grand Rabbi Zalman Leib Teitelbaum, who visits on occasion, as his summer residence is in nearby Swan Lake. Grand Rabbi Ben Zion Halberstam, the Bobover Rebbe spends his summers at the nearby Chiel Kurtz Bungalow Colony in White Lake, as did his late father.  Nearby, the Klausenberger Hasidic community of Union City, New Jersey also has a bungalow colony with a synagogue and mikvah, where the late Zvhiller Rebbe of Union City, New Jersey, spent his summers and would conduct a tish weekly. Yeshivas Shor Yoshuv also has a bungalow colony nearby, where the late Rabbi Shlomo Freifeld would spend summers.

Woodstock
In 1969, Elliot Tiber, whose parents owned the dilapidated El Monaco Motel on Route 17B, received a permit from the town of Bethel to stage a music festival on the motel grounds. When in July 1969 Wallkill refused to issue a permit for the Woodstock Festival, Tiber suggested they use his permit for the concert at the motel. Since the space was too small, the producers then staged the festival on the farm of Max Yasgur,  approximately three miles northwest of White Lake.

References

Hamlets in New York (state)
Hamlets in Sullivan County, New York
Lakes of New York (state)
Lakes of Sullivan County, New York